Mordellistena parvicauda is a species of beetle in the genus Mordellistena of the family Mordellidae. It was described by Ermisch in 1967 and can be found in countries like Albania, Bosnia and Herzegovina, Bulgaria, Croatia, Greece and North Macedonia.

References

Beetles described in 1967
parvicauda
Beetles of Europe